Kaihere is a dispersed Waikato rural settlement on SH27, overlooking the Hauraki Plains. It has a school, hall, domain a rest area and is the starting point for the Hapuakohe Walkway.

Demographics 
Kaihere's meshblock (1069500 includes the school and most houses) had these census results -

Geology 
The village lies on the edge of greywacke, of the Jurassic Manaia Hill Group, and the peat of the Hauraki graben. Much of the village is built on the Pliocene Puketoka formation between those. That formation has boulders of andesite, quartz vein-stone, cryptocrystalline silica, and banded rhyolite, with cobbles of greywacke, in a poorly cemented bed of pumice silt.  The Hauraki rift probably started about 3 million years ago. Subsidence now is about  a year.

History 
The early inhabitants largely used the wetlands for fishing. Ngāti Hako and Ngāti Pāoa lived in the area when early settlers arrived. The Musket Wars caused much disruption in the 1820s.

Government gradually bought the wetlands, including Kaihere, until it controlled enough to enact the Hauraki Plains Act 1908. In 1906 work started on a road to Ohinewai and on cutting the bends in the Piako River below Kaihere Landing. From 1908 stopbanks and drainage canals were built. By March 1915  had been sold to 294 farmers, mainly for dairying.

Flax was milled at Kaihere from the 1890s to the 1940s. Flax growing was set back by fires, which were a problem as the peat dried out, following drainage.

A 2018 plan will strengthen stopbanks and diversion ponds below Kaihere.

Transport 

Until 1941 Northern Steamships linked Kaihere Landing with Auckland thrice weekly. Some of the landing is still visible.

Education

The school has a fort, native bush walk, playing field, netball court and a pool. It is a Silver Enviroschool.

War memorial pavilion 
The 1929 Kaihere war memorial pavilion is listed as Category: A - Heritage Feature in Hauraki District Plan. It is a small timber gabled box cottage, in front of the 1917 Community Hall, with kauri bench seats under the veranda. It was moved from the Domain in Ohinewai Road to the school in 2005, was used by the Woman's Institute and was intended as a library and sports pavilion. A new memorial was dedicated on 25 April 2006, with the moved First World War cairn, a new one for World War 2 and a settlers memorial wall.

References 

Hauraki District
Populated places in Waikato